The men's 50 kilometres walk  event at the 1936 Summer Olympic Games took place August 5.  The final was won by Harold Whitlock of Great Britain.

Results

Key: DNF = Did not finish, DSQ = Disqualified, OR = Olympic record

References

Athletics at the 1936 Summer Olympics
Racewalking at the Olympics
Men's events at the 1936 Summer Olympics